Tiruchirappalli railway division is one of the six railway divisions of Southern Railway zone (SR) of India. It has its administrative headquarters located at Tiruchirappalli. It serves most of the districts of delta region and Central Tamil Nadu.

History and background
The history of division dates long back to 1853, when the Great Southern of India Railway Company was established with its headquarters at England and first line was constructed between Negapatnam and Trichinopoly in 1859. Tiruchirappalli railway division was formed while consolidating all other railways of pre-independence era on 16 May 1956. Also this could be the only division in the world that is serving the railway lines of erstwhile South Indian Railway Company and Pondicherry Railway Company developed by the British empire and French empire respectively.

Administration 
The division comes under Southern Railway zone, which is headed by General Manager, A. K. Agarwal. The division is headed by Divisional Railway Manager (DRM), Manish Agarwal. It was also once headed by Manjula Rangarajan, a 1983 batch Indian Railway Accounts Service officer, who became the first woman to head the division in its 150-year history.

Jurisdiction

The division spans to Tiruchirappalli, Thanjavur, Nagappattinam, Cuddalore, Panruti, Chidambaram Vellore, Tiruvannamalai, Ariyalur, Viluppuram, Tiruvarur, and Perambalur districts of Tamil Nadu state and Union Territory of Pondicherry including Karaikal.

Routes 

 Doubline line is available between Tiruchirappalli Junction and Thanjavur Junction only. 
 Electric Traction available between Mayiladuthurai Junction and Thanjavur Junction. 
 Electric Traction is available between Mayiladuthurai Junction and Tiruvarur Junction.

List of railway stations and towns 
The list includes the stations under the Trichy railway division and their station category.

Operations

Passenger services 
The division involves in operating about 150 trains per day, of which the  stretch chord line experiences heaviest traffic handling about 30 passenger and 56 express trains passing through everyday in addition to goods train, particularly during night.

The division operates about 30 Passenger Reservation System (PRS) centers which includes six post offices at Villianur, Tiruvettipuram, Peravurani, Muthupet, Srirangam, and Ponmalai under the 1,000 PRS scheme, as a part of improving passenger amenities. At the headquarters station, plasma screen electronic display boards, electronic train arrival/departure boards were installed along with a renovated linen room and Integrated Security System to enhance security.

The division became the first in the Southern Railway zone to install multi-coloured LED coach indication boards at Kumbakonam railway station during November 2013 and at Tiruchirappalli junction during January 2014, for Platform.no.1 alone which is supposed to be extended till Platform no.5 and also at about 17 other stations including , Puducherry,  and Mannargudi within the division.

Freight services 
The division has provided team tracks for a number of Industrial establishments adjoining the railway lines utilising the nearby railway stations for their logistics and transports such as Central Workshop (Golden Rock), Cement and gypsum factories (Trichy, Perambalur and Ariyalur), Lignite industries (Neyveli), Sugar factories (Viluppuram and Vridhachalam), FCI and Civil supplies (Cauvery delta districts) also BHEL (Tiruverumbur), and ports (Cuddalore and Karaikal).

Performance

Revenue 
The division posted a decent earning of  during the financial year during 2012–2013 .

Awards 
The division won the overall efficiency medical shield, cleanliness shield and electrical conservation shield for 2012–2013 at the zonal level, in addition to the overall safety shield at the Annual Safety Week Celebrations held at Zonal Railway Training Institute.

Towns and places of interest
On the chord line were Srirangam, Ariyalur, Vridhachalam Jn and Viluppuram Junction. On the main line and branch lines that traverses through delta districts has a lot of greenery in the form of agriculture and towns of religious importance like Thanjavur, Thiruvarur, Kumbakonam, Mayiladuthurai, Sirkazhi, Chidambaram, Cuddalore, Nagore, Velankanni, Tirunallar.

Current projects

Employees 
The division has a total workforce of about 11,430 in various ranks.

Welfare

Healthcare 
The division manages one Divisional Railway Hospital, one Sub-divisional Railway Hospital and seven Health Units/Polyclinics. The Divisional Railway Hospital is at Golden Rock, which was established by the then South Indian Railway Company in 1927, caters exclusively to railway staff of the entire division, has about 297 beds including 100 beds in the newly opened surgical ward.

Education 
The division oversees the management of railway schools within its jurisdictional limit at Tiruchirappalli (SRWWO Matriculation School at Kallukuzhi and RMHSS/GOC) and Viluppuram (RMHSS/VM).

Security

Railway Protection Force (RPF) 
About 275 security personnels including 30 commandos, headed by Divisional Security Commissioner, oversee the security arrangements on day-to-day basis round the clock for the entire division which includes protecting railway infrastructure, escorting passengers in trains and operations in all railway stations. Before being put into active service, all security personnel undergo training at Zonal RPF Training Center at Khajamalai, Tiruchirapalli.

Government Railway Police (GRP) 
Apart from RPF, the Government Railway Police (GRP), a unit of Tamil Nadu Police also assists in civil and criminal issues at railway stations along with passenger safety. This unit was first established in 1932 with Trichy as its headquarters. Later in 1981, the unit was bifurcated and the headquarters was moved to Chennai. This unit has about 1400 personnel, headed by a Superintendent of Police. The jurisdictional limit starts from Viluppuram in the north to Kuzhithurai railway station in the south and Karaikal in the east to Palani in the west. It has about 16 police stations and 14 out-posts along with mobile units in Nellai Express and Rameswaram Express.

See also
 Southern Railway zone
 Indian Railways
 Railway Protection Force
 Tamil Nadu Police

Notes

References

External links

 Southern Railways – Official Website

Southern Railway zone
1956 establishments in Madras State
Divisions of Indian Railways